Lamothe-Fénelon is a commune in the Lot department in south-western France.

History 
The Saint Sixte church in Lamothe-Fénelon has been classified as a historic monument since 1913. During the Ancien Régime, it was called Saint-Sixte de la Mothe Massaut in reference to the Knights of Massaut and Salignac. The church was partly destroyed during the Hundred Years War when the English captured the village in 1367. It has since been rebuilt and retains part of the old Romanesque church.

See also
Communes of the Lot department

References

Lamothefenelon